Neil McColman (February 13, 1834 – December 11, 1907) was an Ontario political figure. He represented Grey East in the Legislative Assembly of Ontario from 1884 to 1886 as a Conservative member.

He was born on the island of Islay, Argyll, Scotland in 1834, the son of Peter McColman, and came with his family to Caledon West, Canada West in 1845. The family later moved to a farm near Collingwood. McColman was a farmer until 1882, when he moved to Thornbury. In 1857, he married Martha Green. He was elected to the township council for Collingwood, also serving as reeve. He was elected to the Ontario assembly in an 1884 by-election held after the death of Abram William Lauder. McColman was a master in the local Orange lodge.

References

External links 
A Cyclopæedia of Canadian biography : being chiefly men of the time  GM Rose (1886)

1834 births
1907 deaths
Progressive Conservative Party of Ontario MPPs
Scottish emigrants to pre-Confederation Ontario
Immigrants to the Province of Canada
People from The Blue Mountains, Ontario